Beating Bowel Cancer was the support and campaigning charity for everyone affected by bowel cancer in the UK. It merged with Bowel Cancer UK in 2018 to create a new charity also called Bowel Cancer UK. Beating Bowel Cancer provided support and information for bowel cancer patients and their families through the UK's only nurse-led specialist helpline for bowel cancer, their online forum and booklets and fact sheets. The charity also worked tirelessly to raise public awareness of bowel cancer and campaign to ensure Governments and health services provide the highest quality care and treatments.

Mission statement

The charity's mission statement was as follows:We are dedicated to saving lives by working in partnership with individuals, local communities, clinical communities and government to improve public awareness of bowel cancer and to increase the rate of early diagnosis. We help patients access the treatment they need and provide emotional and practical support to improve the lives of everyone affected by bowel cancer.Beating Bowel Cancer was the secretariat for the National Colorectal Cancer Nurses Network (NCCNN).

The charity organised a Patient Day for patient and family once per year.

The Chief Executive Officer was Mark Flannagan.

A key part of the charity's fundraising strategy was Decembeard, which took place yearly from 2011 to 2016. This was reported on by Third Sector as having "netted an impressive return".

The charity was involved each year with Bowel Cancer Awareness Month, which takes place in April.

The Board of Trustees 

Chairman
Sir Christopher Pitchers

Board Members
 Paul Jackson
 John Collard
 Hilary Barrett
 Paul Jansen
 Adam Leach
 Deborah Mechaneck
 Lesley Woolnough
 Peter Beverley
 Patrick Figgis

Charity Patrons 

 Lord Crisp KCB
 Professor Lord Darzi KBE
 Matt Dawson MBE
 Dr Chris Steele MBE
 Baroness Floella Benjamin OBE DL

The charity's Charity Number is 1063614 (England and Wales) and SC043340 (Scotland).

References

External links 
 Beating Bowel Cancer
 Charity Commission

Health campaigns
Health charities in the United Kingdom
Health in the London Borough of Lambeth
Organisations based in the London Borough of Lambeth